Uruguayans in the Netherlands are people born in Uruguay who live in the Netherlands, or Dutch-born people of Uruguayan descent. .

During the civic-military dictatorship of Uruguay (1973-1985) several Uruguayans went into exile in the Netherlands.

Notable people 

Deceased
 Yuri Banhoffer (1948–2021), footballer, who played in PEC Zwolle
 José Carbajal (1946-2010), musician
Living
 Pablo Cáceres (born 1985), footballer, who played in FC Twente and MSV Duisburg
 Pepe Fernández (born 1943), footballer, who played twice in HFC Haarlem
 Gonzalo García (born 1983), footballer, who played in SC Heerenveen, Heracles, FC Groningen, and VVV
 Matías Jones (born 1991), footballer, who played in FC Groningen and FC Emmen
 Nicolás Lodeiro (born 1989), footballer, who played in AFC Ajax
 Fernando Picún (born 1972), footballer, who played in Feyenoord
 Sergio Rochet (born 1993), football goalkeeper, who played in AZ Alkmaar
 Bruno Silva (born 1980), footballer, who played in FC Groningen and AFC Ajax
 Luis Suárez (born 1987), footballer, who played in FC Groningen and AFC Ajax
 David Texeira (born 1991), footballer, who played in FC Groningen

See also
Netherlands–Uruguay relations
Emigration from Uruguay

References

Ethnic groups in the Netherlands
 
 
Netherlands